ATHENA is a European Union funded project which aims to provide content to Europeana. It is led by the Italian Ministry of Culture, and "takes its origins from the existing MINERVA network."

References

External links

Cultural organizations based in Europe